This is a list of seasons played by the University of California, Santa Barbara Gauchos in Conference and regular season/NCAA Tournament soccer play, from 1983 (when UCSB first took part in Conference play) to the present day.  It details the club's achievements in Conference, competitive out of Conference, and NCAA Tournament games as well as the top point men and goal scorers for each season.

See also 
 UC Santa Barbara Gauchos men's soccer, the main page to the college soccer team at the University of California, Santa Barbara.

Footnotes 

Gauchos
UC Santa Barbara Gauchos soccer seasons
UC Santa Barbara Gauchos